Vezhan Buzmihr (or Burzmihr, in Georgian sources as Buzmir) was an Iranian nobleman who served as the marzban of Sasanian Iberia. He was headquartered in Tbilisi and was succeeded as marzban by Arvand Gushnasp.

References

Sources
 
 
 

6th-century deaths
6th-century Iranian people
Sasanian governors of Iberia
Generals of Khosrow I